Rawls is a surname. Notable people with the surname include:

 Betsy Rawls (born 1928), American golfer
 Eugenia Rawls (1913–2000), American actress
 Hardy Rawls (born 1952), actor
 J. Rawls (born 1974), American musician and record producer
 Jerry S. Rawls, American Finisar Corporation, President and CEO
 John Rawls (1921–2002), American philosopher
 Johnny Rawls (born 1951), American soul blues singer, guitarist, arranger, songwriter and record producer
 Lou Rawls (1933–2006), American record producer, singer, composer and actor
 Thomas Rawls (born 1993), American football player
 Wendell Rawls Jr. (born 1941), American investigative reporter and editor
 Wilson Rawls (1913–1984), American author

Fictional characters:
 Reggie Rawls, Oz character
 William Rawls, The Wire character

See also
 Rawls College of Business, a business school at Texas Tech University in Lubbock, Texas
 The Rawls Course, golf course on the Texas Tech University campus in Lubbock, Texas